Etchojoa is the seat of Etchojoa Municipality. Founded in 1613, Etchojoa is located in the southwest of the Mexican state of Sonora. The total municipal area is 1,220.23 km². Etchojoa had a population of 56,129 in 2000, according to the official census. Neighboring municipalities are Navojoa, Huatabampo and Cajeme.

Etchojoa has a large indigenous population made up of the Mayo Indians, almost 20% of the population in 2000. The municipality sits in the Valle Mayo (Mayo Valley), named for the Río Mayo, a vital source for irrigation.

The economy is based primarily on agriculture, with over 800 km² irrigated throughout the municipality in 2000.  Fifty percent of the land is part of the ejido system. Wheat, soy, corn, and citrus fruit are the most important crops.

XEETCH, a government-run indigenous community radio station that broadcasts in Mayo, Yaqui and Guarijio, is based in Etchojoa.

External links
Etchojoa, Ayuntamiento Digital (Official Website of Etchojoa, Sonora)

Populated places in Sonora